Funayama (written: 船山 or 舟山) is a Japanese surname. Notable people with the surname include:

, Japanese-American sportscaster
, Japanese footballer
, Japanese politician
Yuji Funayama (disambiguation), multiple people
, Japanese curler

See also
Eta Funayama Sword, a National Treasure of Japan

Japanese-language surnames